Lotis is a genus of lady beetles.

References 

Coccinellidae genera